Unilorin Secondary School is the staff school of the University of Ilorin, Nigeria.
The school is a private school.
The school used to be located near the senior staff quarters in the University permanent site, but it was relocated in 2012 to  the mini  campus of the University.

Achievements
In 2009, a student of the school was the overall best student in the National examination council examinations.

References

Secondary schools in Kwara State
University of Ilorin
Educational institutions established in 1981
1981 establishments in Nigeria
Private schools in Nigeria